Xenotilapia bathyphila is a species of cichlid endemic to Lake Tanganyika where it occurs in schools in areas with sandy substrates.  It feeds on small shrimps and copepods.  This species can reach a length of  TL.  It can also be found in the aquarium trade.

References

External links
 Photograph

bathyphila
Fish of Burundi
Fish of the Democratic Republic of the Congo
Fish of Tanzania
Fish of Zambia
Fish of Lake Tanganyika
Fish described in 1956
Taxonomy articles created by Polbot
Taxobox binomials not recognized by IUCN